The Throbs were an American hard rock band from New York, New York, United States, formed in mid-1988. They featured singer Ronnie Sweetheart, bassist Danny Nordahl, drummer Ronnie Magri and guitarist Roger Ericson. They recorded one album titled The Language of Thieves and Vagabonds produced by  Bob Ezrin and Dick Wagner in 1991 for Geffen Records.  Little Richard made a special appearance on piano on the track "Ecstasy". The band was dropped by their label six months after the release of the album and failed to continue. After the departures of Sweetheart and Magri, Ericson & Nordahl formed The Vibes.

The album has been reissued by Rock Candy in 2007 with additional liner notes and two previously unreleased demo tracks.

Ronnie Sweetheart was a member/guitarist of VO5 with former Skid Row singer Sebastian Bach.
Roger Ericson was a member of Smashed Gladys and can be heard on their 1988 Elektra release Social Intercourse and before that was a member of the cult band Angels in Vain.
Danny Nordahl is now in Faster Pussycat, and was in The Newlydeads with three of his current Faster Pussycat bandmates, and in Motochrist, N-Y loose and Tracii Guns's version of L.A. Guns. He also was one of the passing members of Angels in Vain.
Ronnie Magri was in the band Sweet Pain (Combat Records 1985) with former L.A. Guns and Faster Pussycat bassist Kelly Nickels. After moving to New Orleans in 1995, Magri has been involved in the Neo-Burlesque scene and worked with Dita Von Teese.
A second album by The Throbs was made available online in 2014---appropriately titled Second.

Members
Ronnie Sweetheart – Vocals
Danny Nordahl – Bass, Vocals
Ronnie Magri – Drums
Roger Ericson – Guitar

Former
Pete Trainor – Guitar
Ginger – Guitar
Anthony Smedile – Drums
Jeff West – Drums
Jonny Tingle – Vocals

Discography

Albums
The Language of Thieves and Vagabonds - (1991), rereleased (2007)
• Second (2014)

Singles
"Come Down Sister", (1991)

References

External links
Entertainment Weekly February 15, 1991

Hard rock musical groups from New York (state)
Glam punk groups
Musical groups from New York City
Musical groups established in 1988